RPG II is a very early and popular version of the IBM RPG programming language.

It was developed in the late 1960s and designed to work on the smallest IBM systems of the time such as the IBM 1130, IBM System/3, System/32, System/34, System/36. It was however also available for the System/370, The Singer System 10, Sperry Univac 90/25, 90/30, 90/40, System 80, 1100 mainframe series and the Wang VS Series. ICL produced versions for its ICL 2903 system and for VME/K; and Burroughs Corporation produced an RPG II compiler with database extensions for its B1700 series of computers. Digital Equipment Corporation had their own implementation named VAX RPG II for VAX/VMS systems.

An enhanced version RPG III appeared in 1978.

It has a number of unusual features, including: an implied processing loop; and that it is a fixed-format programming language, so that programs are difficult to read without a special debugging template.

Features
RPG II is a fixed-format programming language, which means that code must be placed in exact column locations in order to generate correct results. There are eight different specification types, and separate coding forms are used to write each, and a special debugging template  used as an aid to read program printouts.

Every RPG II program executes within an implied loop, the program cycle, which applies the program successively to every record of a file - this is documented via a "Logic Flow" diagram on the debugging template. Each record (individual punched card) would be compared to each line in the program, which would act upon the record, or not, based upon whether that line had an "indicator" turned "on" or "off" — from a set of logical variables numbered 01–99 for user-defined purposes, or other smaller sets based upon record, field, or report processing functions. Special variables such as UDATE, UYEAR, PAGE, and so forth, are filled when the program begins or when page overflow occurs, even though there is no explicit instruction for these activities.  Total calculations and output are done at "total time," after the detail cycle when L1/LR has been set on by fixed logic.

The concept of RPG's program cycle fitted neatly with a cyclical machine that read cards, summarised their contents and prints a result, rather like a tabulating machine. The language was extended to handle other input and output devices and provides a fast and efficient method of programming.

Devices such as the workstation (WORKSTN), the keyboard (KEYBORD), or the console (CONSOLE) do not have a fixed number of records at the beginning of the job and therefore, in order to incorporate the fixed-logic RPG "Last Record" cycle, the LR indicator can be set on with a SETON instruction.  LR cannot be set off.

RPG II did not evolve much from the 1977 implementation on the System/34 to 2000 when the Advanced/36 was discontinued from marketing. Changes that were made from the 1970s version included the IFEQ/IFNE/IFGT/IFGE/IFLT/IFLE and END grouping. Also, the call/parm to be able to call external subroutines. Another change was that for internal subroutines, you no longer had to put SR in columns 7 and 8 of the C (calculation) specs.

Third-party providers sold more than 200 different assembler subroutines that could be used by System/36 and Advanced/36 programmers to exceed RPG II limitations. Some of the limitations of RPG II on the System/3, 32, 34 and 36 including the Advanced/36 was the 64K limit and the number of files you could have in a program. So if you had a lot of programming lines or had large arrays, it was easy to exceed the 64,000 bytes of object code. However, RPG II running on the AS/400 and its follow on iseries and IBM i (those running OS/400 or i5/OS in what is called S/36E (execution environment)) those limits (the 64K bytes and the number of files) were either greatly expanded or removed.

RPGII specifications 

In the popular System/36 implementation of RPG II, there are 8 different specification
types:
  
U - Auto Report spec is only required for Auto Report programs.
H - Header spec is at the top of the program and describes compiler options such as maximum compile size, whether the program is an MRT (Multiple Requestor Terminal) program, and what type of listing is generated when the program is compiled.  The object name of the program created is located in columns 75–80; if a source does not have an H spec, the name RPGOBJ is used.
F - File spec(s) are next, and describes the files used in the program.  Files may be disk files (DISK) or may be devices such as a printer (PRINTER), the workstation (WORKSTN), keyboard (KEYBORD), unformatted display (CRT or DISPLAY), or user-defined (SPECIAL).  Record size, block size, overflow indicators, and external indicators are described.  It is possible that an RPG program will not use any F specs.
E - Extension spec(s) are next, and describe arrays and tables, which may be prefetched from disk files (an Input table), drawn from constants placed at the end of the source between ** and /* symbols, or built from calculations.
L - Line Counter spec(s) are next, and if present, describe the form to be printed.  It defines the number of lines in a page and the positions where printing begins and ends.
I - Input specs are next, and describe the data areas within files.  RPG II permits redefinition of data areas so that a field named FLDA might occupy the same area as an array AR that contains 8 elements of 1 character each.  Non-record areas such as data structures can be described.  Depending on the values of the input record, indicators may be conditioned.
C - Calculation spec(s) are next.  Total fields may be described and accumulated.  Complex computations and string manipulations are possible.  Indicators may be conditioned.
O - Output specifications, which describe the output record in terms of fields and output positions.

A ninth was added later in 1977:
T - Telecommunications

Operation codes appear in columns 28–32 of an RPG-II calculation specification.
  

  
 CALL/PARM was added to RPG II with Release 6.0 (also known as the VASP).

CHAIN retrieves the record in the indexed file named in Factor 2 that matches the exact key specified by the value in Factor 1.

SETLL causes the index pointer for the file named in Factor 2 to be positioned at the location specified by the value in Factor 1.

SORTA causes the named array to be sorted in place; that is, the elements appear in order.

Z-SUB calculates Factor 2 with opposite sign and moved to result field.

XFOOT causes an array to be summed and the result moved to result field.

MVR must follow a DIV operation. The integer remainder of the DIV operation is placed in the result field. MVR following the DIV operation for "56 divided by 3" would place the value 2 in the result field.

Indicators 
Indicators are either 'set' or not - so they are effectively  a built-in series of "flags" or boolean data types.
 Standard:
    01 02 03 04 05 06 07 08 09 10 11 12 13 14 15 16 17 18 19
 20 21 22 23 24 25 26 27 28 29 30 31 32 33 34 35 36 37 38 39
 40 41 42 43 44 45 46 47 48 49 50 51 52 53 54 55 56 57 58 59
 60 61 62 63 64 65 66 67 68 69 70 71 72 73 74 75 76 77 78 79
 80 81 82 83 84 85 86 87 88 89 90 91 92 93 94 95 96 97 98 99
 Halt Indicators:
 H1 H2 H3 H4 H5 H6 H7 H8 H9
 Matching Indicators:
 M1 M2 M3 M4 M5 M6 M7 M8 M9 MR
 Control-Level Indicators:
 L0 L1 L2 L3 L4 L5 L6 L7 L8 L9
 Command Key Indicators:
 KA KB KC KD KE KF KG KH KI KJ KK KL KM KN KP KQ KR KS KT KU KV KW KX KY
 These indicators refer to command keys 1 to 24, in that order.  Note that there is no KO indicator.
 First Cycle Indicator (1st Page, mainly used for printer files):
 1P
 Last Record Indicator:
 LR
 Overflow Indicators:
 OA OB OC OD OE OF OG OV
 External Indicators:
 U1 U2 U3 U4 U5 U6 U7 U8

Sample code 

     F***************************************************************
     F* THIS PROGRAM READS THE CONTENTS OF AN INVOICE HEADER FILE   
     F* AND PRINTS THE INVOICES PROCESSED FOR THE DATE SET IN THE   
     F* LOCAL DATA AREA.  THERE ARE LEVEL BREAKS AND TOTALS FOR      
     F* EACH STORE.                                                 
     F***************************************************************
     F*
     FINVHDR  IP  F      62            DISK
     FPRINTER O   F     132     OF     PRINTER
     IINVHDR  NS  01   1NC
     I                                        1   3 STORE L1
     I                                        4  13 INVNO
     I                                       14  20 CUSTNO
     I                                       21  45 STNAM
     I                                       46  53 INVDAT
     I                                       54  622TOTINV
     I           UDS
     I                                        1   8 RPTDAT
     C   01      INVDAT    COMP RPTDAT                   11
     C   01 11             ADD  TOTINV    L1TOT   92
     C   01 11             ADD  TOTINV    LRTOT   92
     OPRINTER H  101   1P
     O       OR        OF
     O                         PAGE  Z  106
     O                                  102 'PAGE'
     O                                   59 'VERY BIG'
     O                                   72 'STORES, INC.'
     O                         UDATE Y   17
     O                                    8 'RUN DATE'
     O        H  1     1P
     O       OR        OF
     O                                   73 'DAILY SALES BY STORE'
     O        H  2     1P
     O       OR        OF
     O                         RPTDAT    83
     O                                   63 'FOR DATE:'
     O        H  1     1P
     O       OR        OF
     O                                    6 'STORE'
     O                                   18 'INVOICE'
     O                                   28 'CUSTOMER'
     O                                   58 'CUSTOMER'
     O                                   78 'INVOICE'
     O        H  2     1P
     O       OR        OF
     O                                    6 'NUMBER'
     O                                   18 'NUMBER'
     O                                   28 'NUMBER'
     O                                   58 'NAME'
     O                                   78 'TOTAL'
     O        D  0     L1
     O                         STORE      6
     O        D  1     01 11
     O                         INVNO     18
     O                         CUSTNO    28
     O                         STNAM     58
     O                         TOTINV1B  78
     O        T  1     L1
     O                                   45 'STORE TOTAL...'
     O                         L1TOT 1B  78
     O        T 1      LR
     O                                   45 'GRAND TOTAL...'
     O                         LRTOT 1   78

References

External links
  System/36-Compatible RPG II - User’s Guide and Reference
  Wiki Midrange

High-level programming languages
Procedural programming languages
RPG II
Programming languages created in the 1960s